Nadezhda Alekseevna Peshkova (née Vvedenskaya, nicknamed "Timosha"; November 30, 1901 – January 10, 1971) was a Russian painter.

She was born, Tomsk, and married Maxim Peshkov, the son of Maxim Gorky. She learned about painting while staying at Gorky's house in Capri in the 1920s. Here she was taught by Pavel Korin, who also later painted her portrait.

She remained living in Gorky's house following his death and participated in turning it into the Maxim Gorky Apartment Museum in 1965. She died in Moscow.

References

1901 births
1971 deaths
Russian painters